Som Kaek may refer to:
Assam fruit
Garcinia atroviridis
Gambooge